Paul Hallez (10 September 1846 - 2 November 1938) was a French zoologist and embryologist born in Lille.

In 1864 he began his scientific career as a préparateur of natural history under Jules Gosselet (1832–1916) at the Faculté des Sciences in Lille. He later defended his thesis at the Sorbonne with an award winning treatise on Turbellaria titled Contributions à l'histoire naturelle des turbellariés. He held the chair of zoology at Lille from 1888 to 1906, then served as chair of comparative anatomy and embryology from 1907 until his retirement in 1919.

In 1888 he founded a marine biological laboratory at Le Portel that was associated with the Université Lille Nord de France.

His scientific work largely dealt with flatworms, nematodes, the phyla- Bryozoa and Nemertea, etc. He described a number of new species collected from Jean-Baptiste Charcot's Antarctic expeditions.

The following species are named after Hallez:
 Timea hallezi (Topsent, 1891)
 Procerastea halleziana (Malaquin, 1893)
 Scaptognathus hallezi (Trouessart, 1894)
 Obrimoposthia hallezi (Böhmig, 1908).
The genus Hallezia Sand, 1896 (Protozoa) is also named after him.

Selected writings 
 Contributions à l'histoire naturelle des turbellariés, 1879 Full text 
 Embryogénie des Dendrocles d'eau douce, 1887 Full text 
 Morphogénie générale et affinités des Turbellariés (Introduction à une Embryologie comparée de ces animaux), 1892
 Catalogue des rhabdoclides, triclades & polyclades du nord de la France, 1894. Full text

References 
  ASA-USTL (translated biography)

1846 births
1938 deaths
Scientists from Lille
Academic staff of the University of Lille Nord de France
French embryologists
19th-century French zoologists
Lille University of Science and Technology alumni
20th-century French zoologists